Celso José Marranzini Pérez (born 11 January 1952, Santo Domingo) is an economist and businessman from the Dominican Republic. He was the Vice President of Corporación Dominicana de Empresas Eléctricas Estatales (CDEEE, "Dominican Corporation of State Electrical Companies"); former chairman of Consejo Nacional de la Empresa Privada (CONEP, "National Council of the Private Enterprise").

He was born to Constantino Marranzini Risk (the son of Liberato Marranzini, an Italian immigrant from Santa Lucia di Serino, and Amelia Risk Assis, a Lebanese immigrant) and María Altagracia Pérez Pintado (the daughter of Celso Pérez, a Spanish industrialist from Asturias, and Carmen Pintado, who was born in Puerto Rico to Spanish parents).

References

People from Santo Domingo
Dominican Republic people of Italian descent
Dominican Republic people of Lebanese descent
Dominican Republic people of Spanish descent
Dominican Republic people of Asturian descent
People of Campanian descent
Dominican Republic businesspeople
Dominican Republic economists
1952 births
Living people